A goatee is a style of facial hair incorporating hair on one's chin but not the cheeks. The exact nature of the style has varied according to time and culture.

Description
Until the late 20th century, the term goatee was used to refer solely to a beard formed by a tuft of hair on the chin—as on the chin of a goat, hence the term 'goatee'. By the 1990s, the word had become an umbrella term used to refer to any facial hair style incorporating hair on the chin but not the cheeks; there is debate over whether this style is correctly called a goatee or a Van Dyke.

History
The style dates back to Ancient Greece and Ancient Rome. The god Pan was traditionally depicted with goat-like features, including a goatee. When Christianity became the dominant religion and began copying imagery from pagan myth, Satan was given the likeness of Pan, leading to Satan traditionally being depicted with a goatee in medieval art and Renaissance art.

The goatee would not enjoy widespread popularity again until the 1940s, when it became a defining trait of the beatniks in the post-World War II United States. The style remained popular amongst the counter-culture until the 1960s before falling out of favor again. In the 1990s, goatees with incorporated mustaches became fashionable for men across all socioeconomic classes and professions, and have remained popular into the 2010s.

Gallery

See also

 List of facial hairstyles
 Beard
 Moustache
 Sideburns
 Soul patch
 Van Dyke beard

References

External links

 

Beard styles